Jacek Eugeniusz Falfus (born 1 February 1951 in Siemianowice Śląskie) is a Polish politician. He was elected to the Sejm on 25 September 2005, getting 27698 votes in 27 Bielsko-Biała district as a candidate from the Law and Justice list.

He was also a member of Sejm 2001-2005.

See also
Members of Polish Sejm 2005-2007

External links
Jacek Falfus - parliamentary page - includes declarations of interest, voting record, and transcripts of speeches.

1951 births
Living people
People from Siemianowice Śląskie
Members of the Polish Sejm 2005–2007
Members of the Polish Sejm 2001–2005
Law and Justice politicians
Bielsko-Biała
Members of the Polish Sejm 2007–2011
Members of the Polish Sejm 2011–2015